Sistemi Territoriali (ST) is a private transport company of Italy. The company is owned by the region of Veneto.

From 1 April 2002 the company took over the management of some regional railway lines and the train services on these lines. Before this date the company was known as Ferrovie Venete It was issued with a licence as a Railway Undertaking and a Safety Certificate for both passenger and freight trains. Since 1 October 2005 the company has been responsible for the maintenance and management of some inland shipping routes.

The company is also responsible for some buses.

Railway services
ST owns and operates one railway line, the Adria–Mestre railway.

ST operates a number of routes for Trenitalia. These are:

 Rovigo-Chioggia 
 Rovigo - Legnago - Verona Porta Nuova 
 Vicenza - Cervignano del Friuli
 Vicenza - Grisignano di Zocco
 Vicenza - Rovigo
 Rovigo - Arquà - Polesella
 Rovigo - Costa
 Rovigo - Cavanella Po - Raccordo AIA
 Vicenza - Verona Porta Nuova Scalo
 Vicenza - Altavilla
 Vicenza - Thiene
 Venice Marghera Scalo - Chioggia - Porta di Chioggia
 Venice Marghera Scalo - Pontelongo - Raccordo Italia Zuccheri
 Venice Marghera Scalo - Padua Campo Marte

Fleet

See also
 Società Veneta

References

External links 

 Official page

Railway companies of Italy
Companies based in Veneto